Zöblitz is a town in the district Erzgebirgskreis, in Saxony, Germany. Since 31 December 2012, it is part of the municipality of Marienberg.

References

External links
www.zoeblitz.de

Former municipalities in Saxony
Marienberg